Xu Dishan (pen name: Luo Huasheng; ; 3 February 1893 – 4 August 1941) was a Chinese author, translator and folklorist. He received his education in China, the United States, Britain, and India; while in school, he studied diverse topics in religion, philosophy, and literature. Upon his return to China, he was an active member of the May Fourth Movement, and published literary journals with his academic peers. He wrote a plethora of academic and fictitious works during his life, many of which he published under the pen name Luo Huasheng. He was best known for his short stories that focus on the people from the southern provinces of China and Southeast Asia. The protagonists of his stories were often women. Xu Dishan was a strong proponent of the Latinization Movement and believed that writing Chinese with a phonetic alphabet would greatly increase literacy. He died at age 47 from a heart attack.

Personal life

Early life 
Xu Dishan was born in Tainan, Taiwan on 14 February 1893. He was one of eight children born to his father, Xu Nanying, and mother, Wu Shen. His father was a Taiwanese jinshi who assisted Liu Yongfu to establish the Republic of Formosa in Tainan. After the Japanese takeover in 1895 his family escaped to Shantou via the harbour of Anping. Following the fall of the Republic of Formosa, Xu Nanying resided in Thailand, Singapore, and Sumatra. After returning from Southeast Asia, Xu Nanying moved his family to Fujian, and in 1897 they settled down in Guangzhou where Xu Dishan received his education. During his stay in Guangzhou, Xu Dishan learned Cantonese, Cantonese opera, Cantonese folk songs, and pipa. He spoke both Taiwanese Hokkien and Teowchew dialect as his mother tongues. After the 1911 Revolution, Xu Nanying received position as an administrator in southern Fujian. Xu Dishan accompanied his father and taught in primary and secondary schools in Zhangzhou. Later, he also worked as a teacher in a Chinese-language school in Yangon, Myanmar. In 1915, he moved back to China where he continued to teach for two years. During this time he taught at both the Huaying Middle School and the Second Fujian Provincial Teacher's College.

Personal life 
In 1918, while Xu Dishan was studying at Yenching University, he married his wife, Lin Yuesen, and they had a daughter. After his graduation in 1920, Xu Dishan traveled back to Fujian to bring his wife and daughter to Beijing to live with him; however, his wife died during the journey back to Beijing. In 1929, he married his second wife, Zhou Sisong; together they had a daughter and a son. Xu Dishan died of a heart attack on 4 August 1941.

Education and academia

Education 
In 1917, Xu Dishan attended Yenching University for his undergraduate studies. During this time, he began to study Sanskrit, and studied the poetry of Rabindranath Tagore, a prominent Bengali poet. He graduated in 1920 with his bachelor's degree in literature and enrolled in the seminary at Yenching University to continue his study of comparative religion. In 1922, he received his bachelor's in religious studies from the university. Upon his graduation, he moved to New York City to pursue a master's degree at Columbia University's Department of Indo-Iranian languages; he graduated in 1924 with a master's degree in comparative religion and the history of religion. He then moved to England, and completed another bachelor's degree at the University of Oxford in folklore, Indian philosophy, religious history, and Sanskrit which he completed in 1926. Before returning to China, he spent a year in India at the Banaras Hindu University to continue his studies in Sanskrit; during this time he also studied Indian literature and Buddhism. While in India, he met Tagore who urged him to compile and publish a Chinese–Sanskrit dictionary.

Teaching career 
In 1927, after returning to China from India, he took up a teaching position at Yenching University. He also spent time teaching at Peking University and Tsinghua University, two elite universities in Beijing. He taught courses that focused on Indian literature and Sanskrit. In 1935, he secured the post of Chinese professor at the University of Hong Kong. His professorship entailed teaching the Confucian classics as well as literature from the Tang and Song dynasties.

Literary involvement

Writing style 
Xu Dishan's writing style diverges from many of his contemporaries. Some of his earliest writings follow convention May Fourth Era story lines, but are not set in China. Xu Dishan takes up Southeast Asian communities as his subjects in many of his stories. Additionally, many of his earliest writings showcase powerful women and explore religious themes. Often, these women gain strength from the teachings of multiple religions, rather than strictly adhering to the dogma of just one; in this way Xu Dishan's female protagonists are world citizens who make their own way in the world. His works with religious underpinnings tend to focus on such themes as love, charity, and other values fundamental to religion; through his writing, he illustrates the omnipresence of religion in all life. His fascination with Theravada Buddhism influences his work, and many of his stories draw inspiration from Buddhist, Hindu, and Christian myths. Many May Fourth Era writers write about myths individually, but Xu Dishan incorporates mythic elements into his stories. Xu Dishan's fiction tends to be romantic and involve sophisticated plot lines which deal with human nature and how to live a good life. They often engage a moral message that usually engages with the idea that how one attains his goal is just as important as the goal itself; in other words, the means are just as important as the ends.

Literary involvement (1919–1921) 
While at Yenching University, Xu Dishan was an active part of the May the Fourth Movement and the New Culture Movement; he participated by attending meetings and organizing conversations with his fellow students. Xu Dishan, Qu Qiubai, and Zheng Zhenduo edited Xin shihue xunkan (New Society Thrice Monthly), a journal that was in publication from November 1919 to May 1920. In 1921, Xu Dishan, Zheng Zhenduo, Mao Dun, and Ye Shaojun founded the literary society Wenxue yanjiu hui (Literary Research Association). Also in 1921, Xu Dishan and Zheng Zhenduo established the Taige'er yanjiu hui (Tagore Research Society), which operated as a subsidiary of the Literary Research Association. Among other duties, the Literary Research Association was responsible for editing Xiaoshuo yuebao (Fiction Monthly), the magazine in which Xu Dishan published his first short stories. Xu Dishan published his writing under the pen name Luo Huasheng.

Literary involvement (1925–1934) 
Xu Dishan continued to publish short publications in Xiaoshuo yuebao (Short Story Monthly) while he studied and taught. In 1925, his short stories were published in the collection Zhuiwang laozhu (The Web Mending Spider), and his essays were collected into the work Kongshan lingyu (Timely Rain on an Empty Mountain). Additionally, he wrote about how Indian and Iranian literature influenced literature produced in China; he continued his engagement with Indian literature by translating Indian fiction into Chinese, and in 1930 published Yindu wenxue (Indian Literature). Besides Indian literature, Xu Dishan wrote on a variety of topics. He gathered works written in English about the Opium Wars, and published Da zhong ji: Yapian zhanzheng qian Zhong Ying jiaoshe shiliao (Meeting Halfway: Historical Materials on Negotiations between China and England before the Opium War) in 1931, and in 1933 published a collection of sacred Buddhist texts: Fozang zimu yinde (Combined Indices to the Authors and Titles in Four Collections of Buddhistic Literature). During this period of time, the late 1920s and early 1930s, he also published several satirical critiques of urban society in contemporary China and the unbridled corruption that was prevalent at the time, as well as articles pertaining to women's clothing and its history in the Chinese context. In 1934, he published the first volume of a project he never completed: a complete history of Chinese Daoism: Daojiao shi (A history of Daoism).

Literary involvement (1937–1941) 
During the Second Sino-Japanese War, Xu supported the war against Japan. He involved himself in several patriotic activities, including writing a one act historical drama in 1938, Nü guoshi (The Woman Patriot) which was performed by the Women's Student Association at the University of Hong Kong. He was one of the founding members of the National Resistance Association of Literary and Art Workers.

Latinization 
For Xu Dishan, an important part of the legacy of the May Fourth Movement was the implementation of phonetic Chinese. He was a strong proponent of the Latinization Movement. He believed that the Chinese script needed to be reformed and that China should use the Western Roman alphabet to help spell out words phonetically, instead of using characters. Xu Dishan was an advocate of latinization because he saw it as a path to dramatically increase national literacy rates. In this way, he departed from the mainstream belief held by many May Fourth intellectuals; that is, that the Chinese language should adopt baihua (plain speech).

Publications

Scholarly work

Translations

Plays

Fiction books

Published posthumously

Collections

English translations of Xu Dishan's writing 
"Big Sister Liu." In Stories from the Thirties. 2 volumes. Beijing: Panda Books, 1982, 1: 111–41.

"Blooms on a Dried Poplar." In Stories from the Thirties. 2 volumes. Beijing: Panda Books, 1982, 1: 71–97.

"Director Fei's Reception Room." In Stories from the Thirties. 2 volumes. Beijing: Panda Books, 1982, 1: 98–110.

"I think." Tr. Yunte Huang. In The Big Red Book of Modern Chinese Literature. Ed, Yunte Huang. New York: Norton, 2016.

"The Iron Fish With Gills." In Stories from the Thirties. 2 volumes. Beijing: Panda Books, 1982, 1: 141–57.

"The Merchant's Wife." Tr. William H. Nienhauser, Jr. In Modern Chinese Stories and Novellas, 1919–1949. Eds, Lao, Hsia, Lee. New York: Columbia University Press, 1981, 41–50.

"The Peanut." Tr. Yunte Huang. In The Big Red Book of Modern Chinese Literature. Ed, Yunte Huang. New York: Norton, 2016.

"Spring Peach." Tr. Zhihua Fang. In Chinese Stories of the Twentieth Century. Ed, Zhihua Fang. New York: Garland Publishing, 1995, 173–201.

"Yu-kuan." Tr. Cecile Chu-chin Sun. In Modern Chinese Stories and Novellas, 1919–1949. Eds, Lao, Hsia, Lee. New York: Columbia University Press, 1981, 51–87.

Further reading 
Below is a list of further English-language sources that might be helpful in learning more about Xu Dishan and researching interpretations of his works by various scholars:

Bernards, Brian. "Modern Chinese Impressions of the South Seas Other." In Writing the South Seas: imagining the nanyang in Chinese and Southeast Asian postcolonial literature. Seattle: University of Washington Press, 2015. 29–53.

Galik, Marian. "Xu Dishan's Chuntao (Spring Peach) and Lao She's Ye Shi Sanjiao (Also a Triangle): 'Fraternal Polyandry' in the Chinese Fashion?" Asian and African Studies 18, 2 (2009): 95–113.

Gvili, Gal. "China-India Myths in Xu Dishan's 'Goddess of Supreme Essence'." In Beyond Pan-Asianism: connecting China and India, 1940's-1960's. Eds, Tansen Sen and Brian Tsui. New Delhi: Oxford University Press, 2021. 69–93.

Hsia, C.T. "Lo Hua-sheng (1893–1941)." In A History of Modern Chinese Fiction. Third Edition. Bloomington: Indiana University Press, 1999, 84–92.

McOmber, Douglas Adrian. Hsu Ti-shan and the Search for Identity: Individuals and Families in the Short Stories of Luo Hua-sheng (1894–1941). Ph.D. diss. Berkeley: University of California, 1980.

Riep, Steven L. "Religion Reconsidered: Redemption and Women's Emancipation in Xu Dishan's 'The Merchant's Wife' and 'Yuguan.'" Literature and Belief 24, 1–2 (2004): 101–15.
Riep, Steven. "Xu Dishan (Luo Huasheng)." In Dictionary of Literary Biography – Chinese Fiction Writers, 1900–1949. Ed. Thomas Moran. New York: Thomson Gale, 2007, 250–56.

Riep, Steven. "Xu Dishan (Luo Huasheng)." In Dictionary of Literary Biography – Chinese Fiction Writers, 1900–1949. Ed. Thomas Moran. New York: Thomson Gale, 2007, 250–56.

Robinson, Lewis Stewart. Double-Edged Sword: Christianity and 20th Century Chinese Fiction. Hong Kong: Tao Fong Shan Ecumenical Centre, 1986, 35–60, 183–201.
Robinson, Lewis Stewart. "The Stories of Hsi-Ti-shan: Literature and Life." MA thesis. Berkeley: University of California, 1977.

Robinson, Lewis Stewart. "The Stories of Hsi-Ti-shan: Literature and Life." MA thesis. Berkeley: University of California, 1977.

Robinson, Lewis Stewart. "Yu-kuan: The Spiritual Testament of Hsu Ti-shan." Tamkang Review 8, 2 (1977): 147–68.
Zhong, Yurou. "Phonetic Antimonies." In Chinese Grammatology. New York: Columbia University Press, 2019. 66–97.

Zhong, Yurou. "Phonetic Antimonies." In Chinese Grammatology. New York: Columbia University Press, 2019. 66–97.

References 

1893 births
1941 deaths
Chinese folklorists
Chinese Indologists
Alumni of Mansfield College, Oxford
Academic staff of Yenching University
Republic of China translators
Writers from Tainan
Taiwanese male writers
20th-century Taiwanese writers
Academic staff of Tsinghua University
Academic staff of the University of Hong Kong
20th-century Chinese translators